Goodspeed Publishing was established by Westin Arthur Goodspeed (1852-1926)  in the late 19th century and was based in Nashville, Tennessee, St Louis, Missouri  and Chicago, Illinois. By the early 1880s Goodspeed had found success with a series of state and regional histories in Ohio, Pennsylvania, and other northern states, and went on to repeat that success in other areas of the U.S.

The publications were primarily divided into sections for each county they studied, and included descriptions of each area's geography, history, government, and religious institutions. Each edition included biographies of prominent citizens. Local industries, businesses, and agriculture were also described, providing a glimpse of late 19th century life in places often ignored by other histories. Goodspeed's attempt to include of Native American history in many of these volumes was unusual at that time.

While Goodspeed publications have frequently been cited by American historians and genealogists because they contain economic data and personal biographies of both well-known figures and those who played less famous but significant roles in their communities and states, readers should note that the editor's Preface typically makes this statement: "The publishers disclaim responsibility for the substance of the matter contained in the Biographical Appendix, as the material was wholly furnished by the subject of the sketches."

Selected publications
History of Tennessee from the Earliest Time to the Present, (Chicago: Goodspeed Publishing, 1886)
Industrial Chicago the Manufacturing Interests.  1894
Memorial and Genealogical Record of Southwest Texas
History of Franklin, Jefferson, Washington, Crawford, and Gasconade Counties, Missouri: from the earliest time to the present; 1888.
History of LaClede, Camden, Dallas, Webster, Wright, Texas, Pulaski, Phelps and Dent Counties Missouri.  1889.
History of Hickory, Polk, Cedar, Dade, and Barton Counties Missouri.  1889.
Biographical and Historical Memoirs of Central Arkansas. 1889
Biographical and Historical Memoirs of Eastern Arkansas (Chicago and St Louis: Goodspeed Brothers, 1890)
Biographical and Historical Memoirs of Northeast Arkansas. 1889.
Biographical and Historical Memoirs of Southern Arkansas. 1890.
Biographical and Historical Memoirs of Louisiana, in 2 vols. 1892
Biographical and Historical Memoirs of Mississippi (Chicago: Goodspeed Publishing Company, 1891)
A Reminiscent History of the Ozark Region: Comprising A Condensed General History, A Brief Descriptive History of Each County, and Numerous Biographical Sketches of Prominent Citizens of Such Counties. (Chicago: Goodspeed Publishing Company, 1894)
A History of Knox and Daviess Counties, Indiana; 1886
History of Greene and Sullivan Counties, State of Indiana, (Chicago: Goodspeed Brothers & Co. Publishers, 1884)
Memorial and Genealogical Record of Texas, (Chicago:  Goodspeed Brothers & Co. Publishers, 1894)
Biographical and Historical Memoirs of Mississippi, (Chicago:  Goodspeed Brothers & Co. Publishers, 1891)
Biographical and Historical Memoirs of Adams, Clay, Hall and Hamilton counties, Nebraska, (Chicago: The Goodspeed Publishing Company, 1890)
History of Pike and Dubois Counties, Indiana, (Chicago: Goodspeed Brothers, 1885)
History of Warrick, Spencer and Perry Counties, Indiana, (Chicago: Goodspeed Brothers, 1885)
Wyandotte County and Kansas City, Kansas, Historical and Biographical, (Chicago: Goodspeed Publishing Company, 1886)
The History of Southeast Missouri, (Chicago: Goodspeed Publishing, 1886)

See also
 Books in the United States

References

External links 
GeneaLinks: Goodspeed's Histories
Tennessee Records Repository: Goodspeed's Tennessee, published in 1886/7

Defunct book publishing companies of the United States